Harry Tomi Davies (born June 9, 1955) is a Nigerian British investor, speaker, author, entrepreneur, philanthropist and advisor to technology companies.  He is the chief executive officer of TVCLabs, a technology business accelerator based in Lagos and also sits on the boards of Sproxil, Strika Entertainment, TechnoVision Communications, PeoplePrime and MBO Capital. Davies is co-founder of the Lagos Angel Network and founding president of the African Business Angel Network.

Early life 

Davies was born on June 9, 1955. He attended his primary education at Corona School, Victoria Island, Lagos and later proceeding for his secondary school education at King's College, Lagos and St Gregory's College, Ikoyi, Lagos respectively.
Davies is an alumnus of University of Miami and University of Miami School of Business.

Business career

Early career 
After graduating from University of Miami, Davies worked briefly for IBM as a Systems Engineer before returning to Nigeria to join the oil giant Elf Acquitaine's marketing company where he became its head of Data Processing. He returned to the UK in 1990 and joined Marks and Spencer where he became head of IT Research, registering the retail brands domain and building its first website. He then worked as an Executive Consultant with Ernst & Young where his clients included AB&B, Legal & General, Prudential and Novartis. During the late 1990s dotcom era, he ran the E&Y business incubator Futurewealth as the chief operating officer.  On acquisition of its consulting practice by Cap Gemini, Davies and his incubator team joined Sapient where he became head of Strategy and built direct.gov.uk for the United Kingdom government. He returned to Nigeria as chief operating officer of public-sector consultants Alteq and implemented the World Bank-funded pilot of the first-ever biometric-based Integrated Payroll & Personnel System (IPPIS) for the Federal Government of Nigeria.

Business angel investing 

In August 2012, Davies began angel investing in earnest by co-founding Lagos Angel Network which is a network of individuals and organizations who invest in and mentor start-ups based in Lagos, Nigeria. He later moved on to be the co-founder and president of the African Business Angels Network, a pan-African non-profit association founded to support the development of early-stage investor networks in November 2014.

African Business Angel Network is a consortium of independent African angel investing networks including Lagos Angel Network, Cameroon Angel Network, Cairo Angels, Ghana Angel Network, Venture Capital for Africa, Silicon Cape, Middle-East Business Angels Network and the European Business Angel Network.

Davies through his role as African Business Angel Network president now travels to several countries to support the development of early-stage investment networks and help educate local investors.

TechnoVision 

After helping found the company in 1999, in 2009, Davies became the chief executive officer of TechnoVision, a technology advisory and solutions company which provides these services to private and public-sector clients through its offices in London and Lagos. From 2010 to 2012 he joined the team that revived Mobitel as its chief operating officer. After this, Davies returned to TechnoVision as Collaborator in Chief to set up the technology business accelerator services arm of the business.

SupaStrikas  

Davies owns Strika Entertainment Nigeria, which is the publisher of SupaStrikas in Nigeria and Ghana. SupaStrikas comics is a fantasy football league comic and Africa's highest-circulation publication, with over one million copies circulated monthly to South Africa, Nigeria, Kenya, Uganda, Namibia and Botswana.

Sproxil  

In 2009, after investing in and helping develop the company's business model, Davies was appointed as director for Sproxil Nigeria. He acted as the first managing director for the company in Nigeria from 2012 to 2014 and left the board after over seven years but remains a shareholder.

SlimTrader 

Davies served as an advisor at SlimTrader.

GreenTec Capital Partners 

In 2020, Davies was appointed as the chief investment officer at GreenTec Capital Partners. His role is geared towards increasing investments in African startups.

Philanthropy 

Davies co-founded Laptop 4 Learning, an initiative created to provide access screen-based technology to underprivileged primary school children and their teachers. Working closely with the State and Local Governments, school administrators, parents and local community leaders in Nigeria.

Recognition 

Davies was named the Icon of Hope at the Comic Panel Hero Award 2014. Davies was also given a Distinguished SME Partner Award by Fidelity Bank Nigeria In 2011, he was named Information Technology Champion by the Institute of Software Practitioners of Nigeria (ISPON) and recognized as top 100 Bame leaders influencing the tech sector. 

In 2020 tagged him "Africa's top Angel" in an article that describes Davies angel investment journey from the first company he backed in 2001, his first exit and a decade later being recognized as an architect of early-stage investing across Africa and President of The African Business Angel Network in 2015.

In January 2022 Davies was named by New African Magazine as one of the "100 Most Influential Africans of 2021" for his work nurturing early stage networks.

Personal life 

Tomi Davies is married to Lola Davies and they have three children together.

Published works 

Davies first published book was titled Corporate Bold: What Every Corporate Professional Should Know on June 28, 2011. He later went on to co-author Cracking The Success Code with Brian Tracy (ISBN 978- 0985364304) on May 25, 2012, and The African Project Manager: Managing Projects Successfully in Africa on September 19, 2014.

References

External links 

Official Website

1955 births
Living people
Nigerian venture capitalists
Angel investors
St Gregory's College, Lagos alumni
King's College, Lagos alumni
University of Miami Business School alumni
Businesspeople from Lagos
21st-century Nigerian businesspeople